Drew William Allbritten (born April 24, 1947) is a former member of the Michigan House of Representatives.

Allbritten worked an educator, starting as middle school and high school mathematics and science teacher. He later worked as a college administrator. On November 7, 1978, Allbritten was elected to the Michigan House of Representatives where he represented the 93rd district from January 10, 1979 to 1980.

References

Living people
1947 births
American academic administrators
Republican Party members of the Michigan House of Representatives
Schoolteachers from Michigan
20th-century American politicians